McSweeney's Publishing is an American non-profit publishing house founded by Dave Eggers in 1998 and headquartered in San Francisco.

Initially publishing the literary journal Timothy McSweeney's Quarterly Concern, the company has moved to novels, books of poetry, and other periodicals.

Company history
Since 2002 Advanced Marketing Services had been the parent company of McSweeney's distributor Publishers Group West (PGW), but in 2006 they declared bankruptcy. At the time of the filing, PGW owed McSweeney's about $600,000.  McSweeney's eventually accepted an offer from Perseus Books Group to take over distribution; the deal paid McSweeney's 70 percent of the money owed by PGW. In June 2007, McSweeney's held a successful sale and eBay auction which helped make up the difference.

As of 2013, the company's archives, including rare material from its founding and its early history, are held in the Harry Ransom Center at the University of Texas.

In October 2014, Dave Eggers announced that McSweeney's would become a nonprofit and began asking for donations for several projects on its website. Eggers cited declining sales and increased opportunities for raising funds as reasons for McSweeney's long-discussed change to a nonprofit publishing house.

As of 2015, McSweeney's expanded its operations into partnerships with companies including eyewear one-for-one Warby Parker and accommodations marketplace Airbnb. The musician Beck has worked in tandem with Warby Parker and McSweeney's to design a custom pair of spectacles. In addition to its Fast Company award, McSweeney's has received "best of" awards and plaudits from SF Weekly and several other publications.

In 2019, McSweeney's began publishing Illustoria magazine, founded by Joanne Meiyi Chan.

Company name
In 2004, Eggers said that when he was a child his family received letters addressed from someone named Timothy McSweeney, who claimed to be a relative of his mother. Eggers now claims that the real McSweeney is in care for mental illness, and his letters arrived as a result of confusion over the fact that Eggers' grandfather, who delivered Timothy at birth, and a McSweeney family, who adopted him, had the same name.

Publications
In addition to a book list of approximately ten titles a year, McSweeney's also publishes the quarterly literary journal, Timothy McSweeney's Quarterly Concern, the daily-updated humor site McSweeney's Internet Tendency, and Illustoria, an art and storytelling magazine for six to 11-year olds. The bimonthly magazine The Believer, the quarterly food journal Lucky Peach, and the sports journal Grantland Quarterly, in association with sports and pop culture website Grantland, were all established and incubated by McSweeney's. A quarterly DVD magazine, Wholphin, was decommissioned in 2012. The publishing house also runs additional imprints occasionally, including McSweeney's McMullens, a children's book department; McSweeney's Poetry Series, and the Collins Library, which reprints unusual titles. Version 2.0 of McSweeney's iOS app was released in 2011; the Organist, a podcast produced by the editors of The Believer and KCRW, launched in 2012.

Authors
McSweeney's has helped launch the careers of dozens of emerging writers, including Rebecca Curtis, Paul Legault, Philipp Meyer, and Wells Tower; it has also published the works of well-established authors such as Michael Chabon, Stephen King, David Foster Wallace, George Saunders, Michael Ian Black, Nick Hornby, and Joyce Carol Oates. The house has also published the work of musicians, critics and artists including David Byrne and Beck. The band One Ring Zero gained popularity by performing at early McSweeney's events in New York and solicited lyric-writing assistance from McSweeney's contributors for the 2004 album, As Smart As We Are. McSweeney's was also the subject of the They Might Be Giants song "The Ballad of Timothy McSweeney."

Non-McSweeney's collections
These titles are typically compilations of McSweeney's works either from print or online sources. The publisher of the works is listed at the end.

McSweeney's Mammoth Treasury of Thrilling Tales by Michael Chabon   (2003,    Vintage)
Created in Darkness by Troubled Americans by Dave Eggers   (2004, Knopf)
McSweeney's Enchanted Chamber of Astonishing Stories by Michael Chabon  (2004, Vintage)
Created in Darkness by Troubled Americans by Dave Eggers  (2005, Vintage)
The McSweeney's Joke Book of Book Jokes  (2008, Vintage)
Mountain Man Dance Moves: The McSweeney's Book of Lists  (2006, Vintage)
Greetings from the Ocean's Sweaty Face: 100 McSweeney's Postcards  (2009,  Chronicle)

Reception 
McSweeney's was named by Fast Company as the country's seventh most innovative media company in 2012. McSweeney's literary journal is a three-time winner and eight-time finalist for the National Magazine Award for Fiction. In contrast, in 2001, the New York Times noted "The McSweeneyites may be the current emperors of cool, but they're starting to need some new clothes."

In 2019, Vida named McSweeney's Quarterly literary journal as the magazine publishing the highest percentage of women's and trans voices—71%—compared to their magazine peers.

In 2021, Axios reported that readership tripled across its web and print publications.

826 Valencia Publications
These titles are releases of/by non-profit organization 826 Valencia, published by McSweeney's/826.

826 Quarterly Vol. 1 Students in Conjunction With 826 Valencia 2003/05/01
826 Quarterly Vol. 2 Students in Conjunction With 826 Valencia 2003/09/01
826 Quarterly Vol. 3 Students in Conjunction With 826 Valencia 2004/09/01
826 Quarterly Vol. 4 Students in Conjunction With 826 Valencia 2005/05/01
826 Quarterly Vol. 5 Students in Conjunction With 826 Valencia 2005/10/28
826 Quarterly Vol. 6 Students in Conjunction With 826 Valencia 2006/10/01
826 Quarterly Vol. 7 Students in Conjunction With 826 Valencia 2007/10/28
826 Quarterly Vol. 8 Students in Conjunction With 826 Valencia 2007/11/28
826nyc Review: Issue One Students in Conjunction With 826 Valencia / Seeley, Scott / Potts, Sam 2005/08/01
826nyc Review: Issue Two Students in Conjunction With 826 Valencia / Seeley, Scott / Potts, Sam 2006/06/01
826nyc Review: Issue Three Students in Conjunction With 826 Valencia / Seeley, Scott / Potts, Sam 2008/09/28
826NYC Art Show: A Limited Edition Catalog of 23 Original Pieces by Prominent Contemporary Artists 826NYC (EDT) 2007/08/28

References

External links
Official website
"Too Cool for Words", by Judith Shulevitz, a 2001 review of everything McSweeney's from The New York Times
 A.O. Scott's New York Times Believers, 2005 on McSweeney's and n+1
 Stephen Amidon Sunday Times, "Their Master's Voice: The Rise and Rise of Brand McSweeney's", February 3, 2008

 
Book publishing companies based in San Francisco
Magazine publishing companies of the United States
Publishing companies established in 1998
1998 establishments in California